A general election was held in the United Kingdom on Thursday 18 June 1970 and all 71 seats in Scotland were contested. The Labour Party won the most seats for the fourth consecutive election, whilst the Scottish National Party won a seat for the first time in a general election, having won their first ever Westminster seat at the 1945 Motherwell by-election and another shock victory in the Hamilton by-election in 1967.

MPs 
List of MPs for constituencies in Scotland (1970–February 1974)

Results

Votes summary

References 

1970s elections in Scotland
February 1974
1970 in Scotland
1970 United Kingdom general election